Wilbur Harden (December 31, 1924 in Birmingham, Alabama – June 10, 1969 in New York City) was an American jazz trumpeter, flugelhornist, and composer.

Harden is best remembered for his recordings with saxophonists Yusef Lateef and John Coltrane, and with trombonist Curtis Fuller. One of the earliest jazz trumpeters to double on flugelhorn, he began his career with Roy Brown and Ivory Joe Hunter, before moving to Detroit in 1957 to play with Yusef Lateef's quintet. His music career ended in 1960 due to health problems.

He is a 1991 inductee of the Alabama Jazz Hall of Fame.

Discography

As leader
 The King and I (1958, Savoy Records)
 Mainstream 1958 (1958, Savoy)
 Jazz Way Out (1958, Savoy)
 Tanganyika Strut (1958, Savoy)

Compilations
 Dial Africa: The Savoy Sessions (1977, Savoy)
 Gold Coast (1977, Savoy)
 Countdown: The Savoy Sessions (1978, Savoy)
 The Complete Savoy Sessions (1999)
 The Complete Mainstream 1958 Sessions  (2009)

As sideman
With John Coltrane
Gold Coast (1958, Savoy Records)
Stardust (1958, Prestige Records)
Standard Coltrane (1958, Prestige Records)
The Master (Prestige Records)
Bahia (Prestige Records)

With Curtis Fuller
Images of Curtis Fuller (1960, Savoy Records)

With Yusef Lateef
Jazz and the Sounds of Nature (Savoy, 1957)
Prayer to the East (Savoy, 1957)
The Sounds of Yusef (Prestige, 1957)
Other Sounds (New Jazz, 1957)
Cry! - Tender (New Jazz, 1957)

References

1924 births
1969 deaths
American jazz trumpeters
American male trumpeters
American jazz composers
American male jazz composers
Hard bop trumpeters
Post-bop trumpeters
American jazz flugelhornists
Savoy Records artists
20th-century American male musicians
20th-century jazz composers